Isaac Phillips is an American songwriter, producer, and guitarist, best known for his work with producer Rodney "Darkchild" Jerkins. Phillips has written for Whitney Houston and Brandy Norwood, among others.

Songwriting and guitarist credits

Credits are courtesy of Discogs, Spotify and AllMusic.

Awards and nominations

References 

Living people

Year of birth missing (living people)